Andrew Tite (born Andrew Michael Joseph Tite on March 28, 1981) is a Canadian actor. Born in Toronto, Ontario, Tite grew up in rural Mount Albert and suburban Newmarket, Ontario. He was named Newmarket's First Squeegee Kid by the local newspaper, The Era-Banner when he was 16 years old. At the early age of 5, Andrew was a child model represented by Parker (Talent Agency). In his 20s, he became an actor in theatre, film, and television.

History
As a child, Tite lived in the city of Toronto and the town of Markham until the age of 9. For several years he had his first taste of the entertainment industry as a male child model for an agency called Parker.

In the early 1990s, Tite was raised in the rural area of a small town called Mount Albert and later Newmarket. In 1997 he left home at the young age of 16 becoming homeless and a squeegee kid on the streets of downtown Toronto. After returning to Newmarket, still homeless, he started making some money for food and shelter with his squeegee. The local newspaper picked up on this story and proclaimed him Newmarket's First Squeegee Kid on the front page of their publication (The Era-Banner, June 15, 1997). Several letters to the editor were received and printed. Some calling Andrew Tite a menace from Toronto, some calling Andrew Tite "Very much a part of York Region." (The Era-Banner, June 17, 1997).

After Tite reached his 20s, he discovered performing in local theatre productions and student films. He now performs on television, film, and various theatre productions in Toronto and Vancouver. He also performs at live events as a mascot or scare actor for employers such as Air Transat, Just For Laughs, Canada's Wonderland, and Screemers.

Andrew Tite was featured in an article in the Toronto and Vancouver editions of Metro News (Aug. 25, 2008) regarding his work as a Mascot Performer in both cities.

Filmography
 Exciting New Episode (2005)
 Friends (2005)
 Mighty Hand (2005)
 Between Birth and Death (2006)
 The Serial Killer (2006)
 Zombie Jesus! (2006)
 Death (2007)
 Moonlight Sonata (2007)
 The Howlers Come (2007)
 Yes Man (2007)
 Typhonia (2007)
 Final 24 (2007)
 Cycle of Fear: There Is No End (2008)
 Charming Men (2008)

Theatre
 Blackpool & Parrish (2005), Theatre On Main
 Pirates of Penzance (2006), Theatre Aurora
 A Christmas Carol (2006), Marquee Productions
 Romeo & Juliet (2007), Studio BLR
 Halloween Haunt (2007), Canada's Wonderland
 Screemers (2008), 
 Blackpool & Parrish (2009), OnStage Uxbridge
 Dracula: A Love Story (2013), BTW
 City of Joy (2013), BTW
 The Horse We Rode In On (2014), BTW
 The Prisoner of Tehran (2014), Theatre Aurora

References

.

.

.

External links
 Andrew Tite's official site

Related video
Exciting New Episode
Death
Pirates of Penzance, c/o Rogers Television
Mighty Hand
Hamlet
Airnest performance at Rogers Centre (Toronto) c/o Rogers

1981 births
Living people
Male actors from Toronto
Canadian male television actors
Canadian male film actors
Canadian male stage actors